The Korean War Veterans Memorial is an outdoor monument by Edward L. Hankey commemorating the more than 289,000 Texans who served in the Korean War, installed on the Texas State Capitol grounds, in Austin, Texas, United States. The memorial was erected in 1999 by the Texas Lone Star Chapter of the Korean War Veterans Association. It features a star-shaped Texas Sunset Red Granite pedestal topped with a bronze sculpture of an eagle.

See also
 1999 in art
 List of Korean War memorials

References

1999 establishments in Texas
1999 sculptures
Sculptures of birds in the United States
Bronze sculptures in Texas
Granite sculptures in Texas
Korean War memorials and cemeteries
Monuments and memorials in Texas
Outdoor sculptures in Austin, Texas